Ah Diddums is a computer game released by Imagine Software for the ZX Spectrum in 1983 and can be run on the 16KB/48KB versions of the machine and the Commodore 64 in 1984.

Gameplay
The player controls a teddy bear who is trying to escape a toy box in order to comfort his crying baby owner. Teddy's job is to arrange building blocks in a certain order in the shelf at the top of the screen, allowing him to escape the toy box. On escaping one box Teddy finds himself in another toy box, escape from which is more difficult; there are 99 toy boxes in total from which to escape.

Reception
Ah Diddums won "Best Original Game" at the Computer and Video Games 1983 Golden Joystick Awards.

References

1983 video games
Action video games
Commodore 64 games
Fictional teddy bears
Golden Joystick Award winners
Sentient toys in fiction
Video games about bears
Video games about toys
Video games developed in the United Kingdom
ZX Spectrum games